{{Infobox football club
| clubname   = USM Alger
| image      = Logo USM Alger.png
| image_size = 200px
| alt        = Logo USM Alger.png
| fullname   = Union Sportive de la Médina d'Alger
| short name = USMA, USM
| nickname   = USMAThe  UsmisteOuled El BahdjaL’Ittihad (The Union)'Soustara
| founded    = as Union Sportive Musulmane Algéroise
| ground     = Omar Hamadi StadiumOmar Benrabah Stadium 
| capacity   = 17,500
| owntitle   = Owner
| owner      = Groupe SERPORT (94.34%)Small shareholders (5.66%)
| chrtitle   = President
| chairman   = Sid Ahmed Arab
| mgrtitle   = Manager
| manager    = Abdelhak Benchikha
| league     = Ligue Professionnelle 1
| season     = 2021–22
| position   = Ligue Professionnelle 1, 4th| current    = 2022–23 USM Alger season
| website    = https://www.usma.dz/
| pattern_la1 = _usma21h
| pattern_b1  = _usma21h
| pattern_ra1 = _usma21h
| pattern_sh1 = _usma2021h
| pattern_so1 = _usma2021h
| pattern_la2 = _usma2122a
| pattern_b2  = _usma2122a
| pattern_ra2 = _usma2122a
| pattern_sh2 = _usma2122a
| pattern_so2 = _usma2122a
}}Union Sportive de la Médina d'Alger; known as USM Alger or simply USMA for short, is a football club based in the inner suburbs of Algiers. The club was founded in 1937 and its colours are red and black. Their home stadium, Omar Hamadi Stadium, has a capacity of 17,500 spectators. The club is currently playing in the Algerian Ligue Professionnelle 1.

The club has one of Algeria's most prominent football charts, as it won the Algerian Ligue Professionnelle 1 8 times, the Algerian Cup 8 times and the Algerian Super Cup 2 times, Internationally, USM Alger has won the UAFA Club Championship once in 2013. The IFFHS ranks the USMA in the 18th place of the best African teams of the decade between 2001–2010. USMA reached the final of the 2015 CAF Champions League but they lost to TP Mazembe.

With the past of the Union Sportive Musulmane d'Alger (former name of the USMA), winner of the first 1962–63 Algerian Championnat National, the USMA is the postwar reference Algerian War). In one year, the club Algérois won the titles of Algeria championship and subsequently finalist of the Algerian Cup 1969. The club is going through a difficult period. The club is financially supported, as the USMA was bought in 2010. This privatization is accompanied by positive sporting results: solidly anchored in Ligue 1 since with the arrival of the Algerian investor Ali Haddad follows the title of champion of Algeria Of the Ligue 1 in 2014, the club regularly qualifies for the current African cups CAF Champions League or CAF Confederation Cup And realized 3 titles in 2 years championship-Algerian cup and Super Cup during the season 2013–2014.

History

Early years
In July 1935, Omar Aichoun and Mustapha Kaoui, both merchants of jute bags, decided to create an exclusively Muslim sports association in which no European would appear. At the time, the National Movement, led by Étoile Nord-Africaine of Emir Khalid ibn Hashim, grandson of Emir Abdelkader, ran out of steam while the creation of the PPA (Parti Politique Algérien), spiritual father, was organized. of the FLN, Aichoun and Kaoui, join the popular effervescence. They frequent the activists of the National Movement, many in the district of the Casbah and hear about the need to create sports clubs, the ideal framework to bring together Algerian youth. The increasingly seasoned national movement is pushing for the creation of sports associations.

During the year 1935, the two men will multiply contacts, helped by Arezki Meddad, father of the future chahida Ourida Meddad. Their choice falls on Ali Lahmar, said Ali Zaid, future chahid of the liberation war and Sid Ahmed Kemmat. These men formed the first office of USMA, an office chaired by Ali Zaid, the honorary presidency going to Omar Aichoun and Arezki Meddad. In addition to their nationalist and sporting activities, Omar Aichoun and Mustapha Kaoui also frequent the Nadi Ettaraki (Circle of progress), an association created under the so-called 1901 law. Its head office is at « 9, place du Gouvernement » (Today). Place des Martyrs), in Algiers, The circle of progress is managed by the Islamic Reform Movement (El Islah), led by Sheikh Tayeb El Okbi, whose son Djamel will later be USM Alger goalkeeper. Fearing that the practice of sport is incompatible with the precepts of Islam, those concerned seek advice from the Sheikh, who encourages them and offers his blessing to USMA. For the administrative procedures and in order to obtain the agreement of the colonial authorities, they request the statutes from the Secretary General of the MC Alger, who willingly gives him a copy.

The USMA option having been successful, the PPA renewed the operation and thus Union Sportive Musulmane, Espérance Sportives Musulmane, Jeunesse Sportive Musulmane, Widad and Croissant club were born. They were everywhere these clubs which were schools of Nationalism and Patriotism. Union Sportive Musulmane Algéroise was therefore born, and was ready to participate in 1938 in the 3rd division championship. At that time many players had expressed the wish to come to this club, unfortunately the regulations (license B) prohibited them. In addition, all participating clubs had to have a stadium for the competition. A criterion for which the federation of the time was uncompromising. This is what Mr. Kemmat did in the face of these two problems: “USM Alger at the time required a contract with a stadium for a minimum period of five years. This is to ensure the running of the competitions. I had contacted the leaders of the O club. Pointe Pescade (current Raïs Hamidou) and we had come to an understanding by paying him five thousand francs annually. For the money, no need to tell you where it came from ”, he adds with a sigh which speaks volumes about the state of mind that reigned at that time.

In the 1939–40 season USM Alger played for the first time in the first division and because of the outbreak of the World War II the championship was divided into three groups where USM Alger signed in the group A the team was bad where they won only two games against the same team US Alger and he was defeated in 9 games where he could not face the big teams then like RU Alger and AS Saint Eugène in the end, finished second to last either in Coupe de la Ligue and Coupe de la Solidarité the journey ended in the first round against US Blida and Stade Algérois respectively. The resumption of official competitions occur in 1942. For the 1942–43 season, USMA returns to the third division according to the regulations in force. Mr El-Hadj Ahmed Kemmat intervenes: 

After independence

League beginning with the first post-independence the USM Alger administration to bring the former Nice and Monaco player Abdelaziz Ben Tifour to be a coach and a player at the same time the team took place in Group 5 and took first place with 51 points and strongest offensive line in each league with 75 goal after the piece and in Algiers League in a group with MC Alger, AS Orléansville, NA Hussein Dey and  took first place also with 12 points from 12 to advance to the semi-finals and play against Hamra Annaba previously USM Annaba and won by corners 7–6 qualify for the final of the first tournament in the history of Algeria, and find MC Alger again The Red and Black, led by player-coach Bentifour easily outweigh the score of 3–0 in a match played at the Stade d'El Annasser. Hence the club to Soustara had the honor and privilege of being the first club to win the championship title in the era of independent Algeria. either in Algerian Cup USMA maximum in the semi-final against ES Setif and defeated score 2–4, in the next season USMA finished third, one point behind champion for Algérois group NA Hussein Dey either in the Cup and the team arrived in the semi-final against the same team ES Setif, in the 1964–65 season the team fell to the second division and finished in last place with 54 points either in the Cup stopped the march in the second round against NA Hussein Dey lead to 2–3.

In their first season in the Division Honneur team finished second behind champion MC Alger difference of 7 points to ascend together to Nationale II 1966–1967 in the next season the team failed to return to the first division and finished fifth, in either competition Cup team reached the semi-finals and was defeated again against ES Setif 1–3 aggregate This is the third time excludes USMA at the hands of ES Setif in the semi-finals, in the 1967–68 season after the USM Alger attempts to climb continued but failed again and finished fifth with 45 points, 4 points for second promoted JS Djijel, and finally in the 1968–69 season the USMA was able to return to Nationale I after four seasons in the lower grades and occupied second place behind champion JS Kabylie and celebrations continued arrival of the team, for the first time Reached the cup final However, were defeated against the champion CR Belcourt by score 3–5 after replay the match.

After seven finals, the team was able to achieve first Cup title 1980–81 season against ASM Oran score 2–1 coached by Ali Benfadah in the opening of the Stade 24 Fevrier 1956, becoming the first team to win the cup title from the second division, the following season the team to the second division returned the opening of the season was to Match Super Cup against the champions last season RC Kouba in the first version in the 20 August 1955 Stadium ended with the victory of RC Kouba by score 1–2, The team finished the season in ninth place with 59 points and in monitoring the first post in a continental competition of the African Cup Winners Cup USMA reached the quarter-finals and the maximum in front of the club Accra Hearts of Oak of Ghana 2–3 aggregate.

Saïd Allik Era (1994–2010)
In 1994 Saïd Allik became chairman of the board of directors of USM Alger and promised to return the team to Division 1, On May 26, 1995, USM Alger won away from home against MC Ouargla and achieved an promotion challenge back to the Division 1 after five full seasons under the leadership of Younis Ifticen, Allik announce that USM Alger has returned to its normal place and will not fall again to the second division, In 1995–96 season Ifticen left USM Alger despite achieving the underlined goal to be replaced by Ahmed Aït El Hocine, In Algiers Derby who played in Omar Hamadi Stadium and after USM Alger scored a goal, the assistant referee was injured by smoke gases, to stop and be repeated behind closed doors in the same stadium. After that it was decided that the Algiers Derby would not be played in the future in this stadium with the presence of the fans. After a great struggle with MC Oran for the title and in the last round USM Alger won the title after its victory against CS Constantine at Stade Mohamed Hamlaoui, with a difference of only two points.

in 2002–03 It was the best season in the history of USM Alger and participated in five competitions, The opening season was in the Arab Unified Club Championship, and was eliminated in the group stage, In the Cup Winners' Cup, the red and black reached the semi-finals, and was eliminated against Wydad Casablanca and fails to achieve the first continental title despite the second leg that took place in Algeria Where did USM Alger need to win to qualify for the final. In the Division 1, the journey towards achieving the title was not easy, and the struggle was great with USM Blida, NA Hussein Dey and JS Kabylie, and USM Alger waited until the 28 round to celebrate the title after winning against ASM Oran. To complete the joy in the Algerian Cup by winning the title after the victory against CR Belouizdad after Moncef Ouichaoui scored the golden goal to achieve the double for the first time in its history under the leadership of Azzedine Aït Djoudi. also achieved Ouichaoui top scorer in the league for the first time a player from USM Alger with 18 goals including two hat-tricks.

Haddad ownership (2010–20)

It was decided by the Ligue de Football Professionnel and the Algerian Football Federation to professionalize the Algerian football championship, starting from the 2010–11 season Thus all the Algerian football clubs which until then enjoyed the status of semi-professional club, will acquire the professional appointment this season. the president of the Algerian Football Federation, Mohamed Raouraoua, has been speaking since his inauguration as the federation's president in Professionalism, promising a new way of management based on rigor and seriousness, especially since football has bottomed out in recent seasons, due to the catastrophic management of the clubs which could not go And were lagging behind clubs in neighboring countries that have made extraordinary progress, becoming full-fledged professional clubs, which will enable them to increase their African continent, On August 4, 2010, USM Alger went public in conjunction with the professionalization of the domestic league. Algerian businessman Ali Haddad became the majority share owner after investing 700 million Algeria dinars to buy an 83% ownership in the club to become the first professional club in Algeria. On October 27, 2010, Haddad replaced Saïd Allik as president of the club. Allik had been the club's president for the past 18 years.

On June 2, 2019, it is official, the Haddad family is selling its shares in SSPA USMA which it holds 92%, It was the club's communication officer, Amine Tirmane, who announced it on the Echourouk TV. the reasons that made them make this decision is the imprisonment of club owner Ali Haddad and also freeze all financial accounts of the club. On June 10, 2019, Several sports figures and former leaders linked to the USM Alger have set up a rescue committee to provide solutions to the many problems facing the club of Algiers. On September 4, 2019, The players of USM Alger decided to go on strike to protest difficult financial situation They stressed that this decision has nothing to do with the administration, the fans or the club itself. It is a protest movement against the state of the USM Alger and the delay in resolving the crisis, As a reminder, the USM Alger players have not received their salaries for 6 months, while the new ones have not received any salary since joining the club.

 Groupe SERPORT New Owner (2020–) 
After it was expected that the general assembly of shareholders will be on March 12, 2020, it was submitted to March 2, especially after the imprisonment of the former club president, Rabouh Haddad. The meeting witnessed the attendance of ETRHB Haddad representative and the absence of the amateur club president Saïd Allik, and after two and a half hours, it was announced that Groupe SERPORT had bought the shares of ETRHB Haddad which amounted to 94.34%. in a press conference Halim Hammoudi, Secretary General of SERPORT announced that Aïn Benian project and the club headquarters will be launched soon. He also said that the goal is to achieve continental titles, not only local ones. Previously Achur Djelloul general manager of SERPORT, said they would invest between 1,2 and 1,3 billion dinar per year, while the training center project will cost 1,4 billion dinar. On May 13, 2020, Achour Djelloul announced that he signed with Antar Yahia to be the new Sporting director for three years and Abdelghani Haddi as a new general manager. Yahia said that he had offers from France, but he preferred the Reds and Blacks project, especially the ideas he wanted to implement are the same as Achour Djelloul. société sportive par actions (SSPA) and club sportif amateur (CSA) signed a partnership agreement on January 31, 2021, this agreement that allows the two parties to comply with Algerian legislative texts, and the amateur club will receive 30 million dinars annually in exchange for carrying the logo and name of the club. four rounds before the end of the season SERPORT decided to dismiss Antar Yahia from his position, Yahia said that all powers were removed and they agreed with a new sports director a while ago. Achour Djelloul spoke on Channel 3 and made revelations about it, that was is first and foremost the relationship between an employer and an employee. Add to that Yahia was punished twice by the Disciplinary Committee, and for this we preferred to separate ourselves from this employee. and On September 1, 2021, USM Alger signed with the former player Hocine Achiou to be the new sporting director.

Colours and badge
The original colors were USMA red and Maroon, colors hoisted to the club 1937, year of creation, 1945. The origin of these colors is unknown.

In May 1945, following Setif massacre, Guelma and Kherrata, the club decided to replace garnet by the black in homage to 45,000 protesters Alegrian killed by the bloody repression of the French Armed Forces. Black represents mourning and red blood of the victims.

45,000 Algerian demonstrators came out to celebrate the end of hostilities in World War II that day, recalling the colonial forces their patriotic claims. But the bloody repression of the French army found no other way to meet their legitimate demands that cause genocide. To show their patriotic commitment and sympathy, the leaders of the USMA decided to change their colours. The black is synonymous with grief and they have changed Maroon to red which represents  the blood of martyrs who fell that day.

Shirt sponsor & kit manufacturer

Sonelgaz is the main sponsor USM Algiers since the sports reform of 1977, the company logo is displayed on the front of team jersey as part of the sponsorship.
And until 2011, this logo was even on the emblem of the USMA.
The telecommunications company Djezzy sponsors the club since 2005. On April 2, 2017, The contract was renewed for two seasons between the two sides for 100 million dinars annually. On 21 April 2019 After 14 years of funding for the team, the partnership between Djezzy and USM Alger has been formally terminated, Djezzy demanded that the management of USM Alger withdraw the logo of the mobile phone operator from the shirt of the club and the perimeter of the stadium, in confirmation of its withdrawal from funding the team. Ownership of the majority shareholder of the club, Ali Haddad, the construction company ETRHB, it is also sponsors since 2010.Other sponsors have sponsored the club in the past, such as: Canon Dekorex, Armedic ARTC Insurance, Sonatrach and Renault Trucks.

The German company Adidas, was the equipment manufacturer of the club from July 2012 to December 2016  when the USMA announced a partnership with the Spanish brand Joma. The agreement, which has lasted for three and a half years, took effect from January 2017. On April 21, 2019, USM Alger opens, its first official store, USMA Store, in El Biar, this while waiting for the opening of a megastore to Bab Ezzouar, In addition to the range supplied by Joma, the USMA's boutique offers a wide range of by-products such as scarves, mugs and t-shirts in the colors of the club, The price range is quite affordable for such products, so USMA Joma official jerseys are sold at 4,600 DA (+/- €25 ) while T-shirts sell for 1,600 DA. On September 8, 2020, USM Alger announced that they had signed a three-year contract with the Italian brand Kappa, It is the first Algerian club to contract with the original brand company. On April 1, 2021, USM Alger gets a makeover, the official website of the Italian equipment manufacturer "Kappa" has unveiled the new jerseys that the Usmists will wear this year 2021, This new Kappa jersey is dressed in a dominant white and black, and uses the graphics of the Casbah of Algiers with shades of gray on the front of the jersey. For reasons of comfort and aesthetics, a semi-open round neck is present, just like the iconic Banda Kappa on the shoulders, Its breathable polyester fabric allows it to effectively wick away perspiration. And keep the athlete dry as long as possible. Thanks to KOMBAT PRO technology, the jersey allows unrivaled freedom of movement and comfort, ”described the“ Kappa ”equipment supplier for the away jersey.

Historical kits

 Kit suppliers and shirt sponsors 

Grounds

The club play matches at the 17,500-capacity Stade Omar Hamadi, which was built in 1935, and Stade 5 Juillet 1962 for derbies algérois, and international games deemed too important to be held at Stade Omar Hamadi.

The team is currently the owner of Stade Omar Hamadi several years ago to hold rent by the municipality Bologhine considered the official pitch for the team since independence, but in the many times he had to play on the courts again, notably Stade 5 Juillet 1962, Stadium 20 August 1955 in Algiers and Stade Mabrouki Salem in Rouïba. In Algerian Cup team competition played seventeen final and are Stade 5 Juillet 1962 in twelve Match the first in 1972 and the last in 2013 and Stadium 20 August 1955 three first finals in 1969 and last in 1971. The stadiums Stade 24 Fevrier 1956 and Stade Mustapha Tchaker visits one in 1981 and 2003 respectively.

In 2015 the team arrived for the first time to a final one international competitions and was Stade Omar Hamadi scene of her in the presence of 20,000 supporter but there was a lot of talk about the lack of a final played on Stade 5 Juillet 1962, which a capacity 64,000 spectators but the team administration of his refusal to play there because of the decision to team TP Mazembe play at home Stadium, who's quite similar to the USM Alger stadium and the same grassy ground artificially, which did not like the majority of Supporters. In July 2016 closed the Omar Hamadi Stadium in order to change the ground renovated and its field artificial turf of the last generation and re-opened after a month. On May 6, 2022, Achour Djelloul stated for National Radio that they officially requested to take advantage of Baraki Stadium and that Groupe SERPORT is ready to carry out the remaining works in order to receive it as soon as possible, because Omar Hamadi Stadium has become a danger to the supporters.

Training facility

In July 2011, the club began the construction of a training centre in Aïn Bénian, in Banlieue West of Algiers. This centre will extend over 4 hectares and will include a field in grass natural and another Artificial turf. To complete the construction of the structure, the Architect in charge of the project will be based on the plans of the Ciutat Esportiva Joan Gamper, famous training centre Barcelona. On March 15, 2021, the construction works of USM Alger's training center were officially launched, central technical director and production Rachid Douh stated that the plot contains 30,000 square meters, and will house the club's headquarters two playgrounds inside the hall two changing rooms and two playgrounds with artificial grass. The works will be carried out by EPE Batimetal.

Supporters

Everyone knows the Algerian fans by their numbers and the way they support them and their loyalty to their teams, but when talking about supporters of USM Alger or as they are call them Almsamaah and this name was called to the bands singing women celebrate weddings and sing
This name did not call them in a vacuum and grew to the quality of their songs and their horror, which prompted all the supporters of other Algerian clubs and even the supporters of some of the Arab nomads to quote their songs and replay
The supporters of the Union were not distinguished from the rest of the other clubs' supporters, but in spite of that, they were known for their high sports spirit in accepting the loss and the style of their unique civilizational support, which made them outperform all the supporters of the other clubs

Most of the Union's supporters are based in the capital, but this has not prevented the supporters of the team in all parts of Algeria and even in some neighboring countries and the district of Soutara is the main stronghold and the main base for the supporters of the Union.
From the top of the Sustara through the neighborhoods of Bab El-Oued, Bologhine and Saint-Eugène, and without forgetting the revival of the capital of the Eastern and Western, the phenomenon of Musamiya has become the hearts of the fans of the team. Even in the Kabylie region, we find many supporters of the team.

The team, founded in 1937, has 3 generations of supporters and still has the hearts and minds of many young people
Everyone knows the USM Alger crowned the first tournament in the history of independent Algeria and the biggest trophy in Algeria
But everyone also knows him by his extraordinary and amazing fans, The popularity of the fans was not only because of their wealth, but because of their quality and the quality of their method of advocacy they call themselves Melanesians or Rossoneri and they are already creative in the same way that the supporters of Milan

USM Alger is known for having the best supporters in Algeria, they are particularly known for their songs, their Sportsmanship, as well as their animations in the stands.
The 26 November 2011 to Stade 5 Juillet 1962, on the occasion of an Algiers derby against the MC Alger, the Usmistes supporters became the first supporters in Algeria to make a tifo large-scale. This tifo sported the inscription UNITED by the colors of the club red and black.

At the level of celebrities many popular singers chaâbi encourage USMAlger, most notably El Hadj M'Hamed El Anka The Grand Master of Andalusian classical music and Algerian chaâbi music was one of the biggest fans of the club, also helping the club through his revenues from concerts. Singers chaâbi, El Hachemi Guerouabi, was a famous supporter of the USM Alger and used to come many times to the stadium to watch his favorite team. also dedicated one of his songs to USMA. There are many popular chaâbi singers who support the club, such as Abdelkader Chaou and Mourad Djaafri who presented many songs for USMA. At the level of politicians, the most prominent fan was the first President of Algeria, Ahmed Ben Bella, who was a former player during the French colonialism. Where was a player in Olympique de Marseille, Ben Bella attended the first championship final in Algeria and the winner was USM Alger where handed him the championship cup, after the coup against him and placed him under house arrest by Houari Boumediene. Ben Bella was always asking about USM Alger, Ben Bella was the honorary president of the club until his death in 2012.

CS Constantine, WA Tlemcen and RC Arbaâ
There is a strong relationship between CS Constantine, WA Tlemcen, RC Arbaâ and USM Alger, especially with the supporters of CS Constantine and one of the main reasons for this good relationship that USM Alger was one of the reasons in CS Constantine win the league title for the first and last time in 1997 after losing in the final throw in the championship against them.

Ouled EL Bahdja

Is the best encourage football clubs in Algeria Group was founded in the nineties and the only one in that period, which was recorded with a sporty character songs, as they always give great pictures in the stands on the way the supporters of Milan because of the similarity of the colors red panels and black made the group Ouled EL Bahdja make a big gap in all stadiums inside and outside the home have made many tifo in the Ligue Professionnelle 1 or in continental competitions as for Music of Ouled EL Bahdja Every masses in Algeria frequency with the change of name of the club only because of her fame that went beyond the border in Tunisia and Morocco this famous their songs.

Accidents
On July 5, 1997, in the middle of the black decade, three USMA supporters who were celebrating the Algerian Cup won by their team are murdered in a false dam at Frais Vallon.

On 21 September 2013 Died, two supporters of USM Alger attended the events of the match against MC Alger, after the collapse of part of the "Stade 5 Juillet 1962", The incident and the death of supporters Azeeb Sufyan and Saif al-Din Darhoum, and injuring several hundred others in Algiers spoiled the joy of winning the Darby supporters of the Union, The drama occurred ten minutes after the end of the match. Part of the 13th of the Stade 5 Juillet 1962 collapsed. After this incident there was a plan to destroy the whole stadium, but they retreated and decided to remove only the upper terraces and renovate them completely, the local authorities decided to close the stadium, where an investigation was opened into the incident he was also sacked director of the compound Youcef Kara after that, the funeral was attended by officials of the USM Alger led by Rabouh Haddad, who conveyed condolences to the family of the deceased and their condolences.

On September 9, 2018, And in a match between USM Alger and Al-Quwa Al-Jawiya in the Arab Club Champions Cup at Omar Hamadi Stadium and in the 70th minute withdrawal of Al-Quwa Al-Jawiya's players in protest at offensive chants from spectators. after mentioning the name of the former president Saddam Hussein and anti-Shia slogans angering Baghdad, The Iraqi ministry of foreign affairs summoned Algeria's ambassador in Baghdad over "sectarian chants" made by Algerian fans Ahmed Mahjoub, Iraq's foreign affairs spokesperson, said Baghdad had expressed "the government and the people of Iraq's indignation... at the glorification of the horrible face of Saddam Hussein's deadly dictatorial regime", which was toppled in 2003 during the United States' invasion of Iraq. later, general manager Abdelhakim Serrar said that the concerns of fans if bothered the Iraqi team, I offer my apologies. The goalkeeper and captain Mohamed Lamine Zemmamouche also apologized to the Iraqi delegation for the conduct of the supporters.

Rivalries

MC Alger

The biggest rivalry is considered to be with the Mouloudia Algiers, both from the city of Algier. This rivalry has seen the two clubs contest the local dominance during the Algiers derby. This rivalry also dates back to the 1950s and resulted from a non-sports disputes during the Algerian War. In 1956, the National Liberation Front (FLN) ordered the cessation of all sports, and called to boycott competition by clubs that are related to or called "Muslim".
"Mouloudia" unlike USM Alger and other Muslim clubs, refused to follow the instructions of the FLN and continued its sporting activities including football. This refusal generated several incidents to disrupt the meetings of MC Algiers, and thus, during halftime of the game between Mouloudia and AS Saint-Eugénoise at the municipal stadium of St. Eugene, violent clashes took place and forced the referee to stop the match. Following these incidents, Mohamed Tiar, then president of MCA, resigned to cease all sportive activities of the club  and took the side of the FLN and other Muslim Algerian clubs.

CR Belouizdad

The first meeting between the USM Alger and CR Belouizdad is a local derby in Algiers, Algeria and a fierce rivalry. The derby does not have a common name. From the first meetings in the 1960s, a sport rivalry settled between the two clubs. It slowly fades in the next two decades before being revived in the late 1990s and early twenty-first century.

JS Kabylie

The clasico kabylo-algérois is the name given to matches between USM Alger and JS Kabylie football clubs from  Tizi Ouzou and Algiers, Algeria they are considered one of the most famous clubs in Algeria and their matches are given great attention by the Algerian media, The period between 1996 and 2010 is the most exciting between the two teams because of the great conflict between the heads of the two teams Saïd Allik and Mohand Chérif Hannachi, It is said that the reason for the enmity between the two when Said Alik bringing the star of JS Kabylie and national team at the time Mahieddine Meftah the two teams were both champions and runners-up in the same season five times, including three consecutive times between 2003–04 and 2005–06.

African rivalry
Rivalry between USM Alger and North Africa team considered as exciting, especially with Morocco and Tunisia, where he met USMA with Wydad Casablanca four times, the first in the quarter-finals in the 1999 CAF Cup and win over Wydad 2–2 on aggregate, then in 2002 African Cup Winners' Cup in the semi-finals, Wydad winning 2–2 on aggregate again, 15 years later and in the same role but in the CAF Champions League and once again defeated by a total of 3–1. as for Esperance two teams met four times in all of the group stage in 2003 and 2004 three times won by Esperance and a single win for USMA was 3–0, there is a strong relationship of friendship between the two clubs Esperance and USMA at the level of administration and supporter.

Honours

USM Alger have won the Algerian national championship 8 times, with three Algerian Ligue 1 titles they are second only to JS Kabylie total of Fourteen (The first championship won by USM Alger was in 1963, before the professional era of Algerian football). USMA also have the record in Algerian Cup titles (with 8) Jointly with ES Sétif. USMA have achieved one Championship and Cup "Doubles" (in 2003).

Domestic competitions

 Algerian Ligue Professionnelle 1Winners (8): 1962–63, 1995–96, 2001–02, 2002–03, 2004–05, 2013–14, 2015–16, 2018–19
Runners-up (4): 1997–98, 2000–01, 2003–04, 2005–06

 Algerian CupWinners (8) – shared record: 1980–81, 1987–88, 1996–97, 1998–99, 2000–01, 2002–03, 2003–04, 2012–13
Runners-up (9): 1968–69, 1969–70, 1970–71, 1971–72, 1972–73, 1977–78, 1979–80, 2005–06, 2006–07Algerian Super CupWinners (2): 2013, 2016
Runners-up (3): 1981, 2014, 2019

International competitionsCAF Champions LeagueRunners-up (1): 2015

Regional competitionsUAFA Club ChampionshipWinners (1): 2012–13Maghreb Cup Winners CupRunners-up (1): 1970

 Doubles and Trebles DoublesNational 1 and Algerian Cup (1): 2002–03Algerian Cup and UAFA Club Cup (1):  2012–13

Performance in CAF competitions

USM Alger whose team has regularly taken part in Confederation of African Football (CAF) competitions. Qualification for Algerian clubs is determined by a team's performance in its domestic league and cup competitions, USM Alger have regularly qualified for the primary African competition, the African Cup, by winning the Ligue Professionnelle 1. USM Alger have also achieved African qualification via the Algerian Cup and have played in both the former African Cup Winners' Cup and the CAF Cup.

The first match was against CARA Brazzaville and ended in victory for USM Alger 2–0 As for the biggest win result was in 2004 against ASFA Yennenga 8–1, and biggest loss first defeat in 1998 against Primeiro de Agosto club, and the second in 2013 against US Bitam 3–0.

First participation in International competition were in the African Cup Winners' Cup in 1982 and the maximum in the quarter-finals against Ghanaian club Hearts of Oak, in the 1989 version of the same competition and the club withdrew from the same role after the loss in the first leg against Malagasy club BFV at Stade Omar Hammadi, after that to miss the club's continental competitions for eight years until 1997 in the CAF Champions League for the first time, and almost USM Alger advance to the final match and goal difference in favor of Raja Casablanca.

Then he became the team participated in a systematic manner in various competitions such as African Cup Winners' Cup, CAF Cup, CAF Confederation Cup and the CAF Champions League until 2007 except in 2001 where the team disqualified in 2000 of the African Cup Winners Cup to be punished not to participate in any African competition for a whole year because of the participation an ineligible goalkeeper Burkinabé Siaka Coulibaly against JS du Ténéré from Niger in the second leg, In 2003 the team to reach the semi-finals of the African Champions League at the hands of ousts champion Enyimba, and after an absence of eight years from the African Champions League USM Alger managed to reach the final in 2015 for the first time in its history, but was defeated against TP Mazembe 4–1 on aggregate.

Players

Algerian teams are limited to two foreign players. The squad list includes only the principal nationality of each player;

Current squad

  

Reserve Squad

Out on loan

Personnel
Current technical staff

Management

Notable players
Had senior international cap(s) for their respective countries.
Players whose name is listed in bold represented their countries while playing for USM Alger.

 Ayoub Abdellaoui 13
 Merouane Abdouni Hocine Achiou 8
 Tarek Hadj Adlane Rachid Aftouche Mouldi Aïssaoui
 Saïd Allik
 Djamel Amani Amar Ammour Salim Aribi 8
 Ali Attoui Youcef Belaïli Boubekeur Belbekri 1
 Farid Belmellat
 Raouf Benguit 13
 Fawzi Benkhalidi
 Mohammed Benkhemassa 13
 Mokhtar Benmoussa Yacine Bentalaa
 Abdelaziz Bentifour Hamid Bernaoui
 Omar Betrouni
 Mohamed Boualem
 Brahim Boudebouda Isâad Bourahli Salim Boutamine
 Mehdi Cerbah
 Farouk Chafaï Noureddine Daham
 Oussama Darfalou 13
 Rabah Deghmani Abderrahmane Derouaz 2 3
 Farid Djahnine Billel Dziri 4 7
 Djamel El Okbi Bouazza Feham
 Zinedine Ferhat Karim Ghazi Tarek Ghoul 5
 Nacer Guedioura Abderrahmane Meziane 13
 Abderrahmane Meziani Moulay Haddou Fayçal Hamdani 5
 Mohamed Hamdoud Djamel Keddou Nacereddine Khoualed 10
 Hamza Koudri Abdelkader Laïfaoui Khaled Lemmouchia Mahieddine Meftah 5 6 7
 Djamel Menad
 Hocine Metref Hichem Mezaïr 8
 Amokrane Oualiken
 Moncef Ouichaoui
 Azzedine Rahim 4
 Krimo Rebih
 Smaïl Slimani 2
 Saad Tedjar 11
 Hamza Yacef
 Mounir Zeghdoud 5 6 7
 Lamine Zemmamouche 12
 Djamel Zidane Mohamed Rabie Meftah 14
 Mohamed Benyahia 14
 Daniel Moncharé
 Freddy Zemmour
 Mamadou Diallo 9
 Mintou Doucoure Carolus Andriamatsinoro Abdoulaye Maïga 15
 Michael Eneramo
 Nacer Zekri 4
 Muaid Ellafi'''

Notes

Note 1: played at the 1968 African Cup of Nations.
Note 2: played at the 1980 African Cup of Nations.
Note 3: played at the 1980 Summer Olympics.
Note 4: played at the 1996 African Cup of Nations.
Note 5: played at the 1998 African Cup of Nations.
Note 6: played at the 2000 African Cup of Nations.
Note 7: played at the 2002 African Cup of Nations.
Note 8: played at the 2004 African Cup of Nations.
Note 9: played at the 2004 Summer Olympics.
Note 10: played at the 2011 African Nations.
Note 11: played at the 2013 African Cup of Nations.
Note 12: played at the 2014 FIFA World Cup.
Note 13: played at the 2016 Summer Olympics.
Note 14: played at the 2017 Africa Cup of Nations.
Note 15: played at the 2012 Africa Cup of Nations.

Records and statistics

Mohamed Lamine Zemmamouche currently holds the team record for total number of games played with 400 matches until the end of the 2020–21 season, including 294 matches in the league. Nacereddine Khoualed has the second most appearances for the club with 286 matches. Karim Ghazi is the third most capped player with 241 matches. In the continental level, Hocine Achiou is the most capped player; involved in 38 matches, including 29 matches in the CAF Champions League. Malagasy Carolus Andriamatsinoro is the most capped foreign player with 132 matches in five seasons, also there is the French player Freddy Zemmour, who played with USMA six seasons immediately after the independence of Algeria and in unofficial statistics it is said that he played more than 200 matches with the team but can not be sure of that, Mahieddine Meftah is USM Alger's most capped international player. as for the scorers and beginning of the 1995–96 season Billel Dziri is the best scorer with 74 goals in all competitions and at the same time the best scorer in the League with 51 goals and in the continental competition with 16 goals, as for Tarek Hadj Adlane is the best scorer in the Algerian Cup with 11 goals also Moncef Ouichaoui is the only player of USM Alger in the history who won the league's top scorer in the 2002–03 season with 18 goals and at the continental level, Malian Mamadou Diallo won the top scorer of the CAF Champions League in 2004 with 10 goals.

USM Alger is the most team to reach the Algerian Cup final with 17 times, including five consecutive ones. The first cup achieved by the team was after seven finals in 1981 against ASM Oran, at that time the team was in the second division to become the first Algerian team to achieve the Algerian Cup at this level. The club is one of only four clubs to have won the Algerian Cup twice in succession, in 2003 and 2004. USMA share with ES Setif, MC Alger and CR Belouizdad the record of Algerian Cup titles with eight.  USM Alger's biggest winning scoreline in a competitive match is 13–0, achieved against SO Berrouaghia in the Critériums d'Honneur in 1962 and League's biggest win was 11–0 against ASM Oran in the 1975–76 season. League's biggest loss was  1–7  against JS Kabylie in 1989 in Tizi Ouzou. USM Alger is the second most successful team in the Domestic League with (8) Titles. USM Alger have achieved "Doubles" once (in 2003). Every starting player in USM Alger's 48 games of the 2012–13 season was a full international – a new club record. USM Alger were also the second Algerian club to reach the final of the CAF Champions League, in 2015, losing 4–1 on aggregate to TP Mazembe. Noureddine Saâdi holds the record for most games managed with 133, winning two titles. Rolland Courbis is the first foreign coach to achieve a title with the team when he won the Algerian Cup in 2013. The 700,000 Euro  transfer of Mamadou Diallo to Nantes in 2004 is the team's highest fee received for a player. The 400,000 Euros transfer of Kaddour Beldjilali from Étoile du Sahel in 2014 is the team's highest fee paid for a player.

Statistics

Recent seasons

The season-by-season performance of the club over the last ten years

In Africa
:

Non-CAF competitions
:

References

Notes

External links

 Official Site USMA dz

 
Association football clubs established in 1937
Football clubs in Algeria
Football clubs in Algiers
Algerian Ligue Professionnelle 1 clubs
1937 establishments in Algeria
Sports clubs in Algeria